Fausett is a surname. Notable people with the surname include:

Buck Fausett (1908–1994), American baseball player and manager
Dean Fausett (1913–1998), American painter, brother of Lynn
Lynn Fausett (1894–1977), American painter